Ronald Herbert Smith (25 November 1929 – September 2010) was an English professional footballer who played as a half-back in the Football League for York City, and in non-League football for Harrogate Railway Athletic.

References

1929 births
Footballers from York
2010 deaths
English footballers
Association football midfielders
Harrogate Railway Athletic F.C. players
York City F.C. players
English Football League players